One of Us may refer to:

Film
 One of Us (1989 film) (Echad Mi'Shelanu), an Israeli film directed by Uri Barbash
 One of Us (2017 film), an American documentary directed by Heidi Ewing and Rachel Grady
 "One of us, one of us!", a line from the 1932 film Freaks

Literature
 One of Us (book), a 2013 book by Åsne Seierstad
 One of Us (novel), a 1998 novel by Michael Marshall Smith
 One of Us, a 2014 novel by Tawni O'Dell
 One of Us: Life of Margaret Thatcher, a 1989 book by Hugo Young
 One of Us: Richard Nixon and the American Dream, a 1991 book by Tom Wicker

Music

Albums
 One of Us (Joan Osborne album) or the 1995 title song (see below), 2005
 One of Us (Pomegranates album) or the title song, 2010
 One of Us (Young Love album), 2009
 One of Us, by Mystery Skulls, or the title song, 2017

Songs
 "One of Us" (ABBA song), 1981
 "One of Us" (Ava Max song), 2023
 "One of Us" (Joan Osborne song), 1995
 "One of Us" (Liam Gallagher song), 2019
 "One of Us", by Dawes from We're All Gonna Die, 2016
 "One of Us", by Jagúar, 2005
 "One of Us", by Martha Wainwright from Goodnight City, 2016
 "One of Us", by Matt Stell, 2022
 "One of Us", by Mayday Parade from Black Lines, 2015
 "One of Us", by New Politics from Lost in Translation, 2017
 "One of Us", by Rick Ross from Black Market, 2015
 "One of Us", by Wire from Object 47, 2008
 "One of Us", from the film The Lion King II: Simba's Pride, 1998
 "One of Us (Will Weep Tonight)", by Patti Page 1960

Television

Series
 One of Us (TV series), a 2016 British drama miniseries

Episodes
 "One of Us" (The 4400), 2007
 "One of Us" (The Adventures of Jimmy Neutron: Boy Genius), 2006
 "One of Us" (Agents of S.H.I.E.L.D.), 2015
 "One of Us" (The Bill), 1998
 "One of Us" (The Ghost Squad), 2005
 "One of Us" (Lost), 2007
 "One of Us" (Mysterious Ways), 2001
 "One of Us" (Yes, Prime Minister), 1986
 "One of Us", an episode of M.K. 22, 2004
 "One of Us", an episode of The Newsroom, 2004

Other uses
 One of Us, a 2013 European Citizens' Initiative